School of the Heart, or Yangmingism, known in Mandarin as , lit. Throughout the whole Yuan dynasty, as well as in the beginning of the Ming dynasty, the magistral philosophy in China was the Rationalistic School, another Neo-Confucianism school emphasizing the importance of observational science built by Cheng Yi and especially Zhu Xi. Wang Yangming, on the other hand, developed his philosophy as the main intellectual opposition to the Cheng-Zhu School. Yangmingism is considered to be part of the School of Mind established by Lu Jiuyuan, upon whom Yangming drew inspirations. Yangming argued that one can learn the supreme principle (理, pinyin: Li) from their minds, objecting to Cheng and Zhu's belief that one can only seek the supreme principle in the objective world. Furthermore, Yangmingism posits a oneness of action and knowledge in relation to one's concepts of morality. This idea, "regard the inner knowledge and the exterior action as one", or "" in Chinese, is the main tenet in Yangmingism.

Yangming's philosophy was inherited and spread by his disciples. Eventually, Yangmingism took the dominating place of Cheng-Zhu School and started to have followers outside China. Yangmingism became an influence on the incipient anti-foreigner movement in 19th century Japan. In the 20th century, Japanese author and nationalist Yukio Mishima examined Yangmingism as an integral part of the ideologies behind the Meiji Restoration as well as further samurai resistance, in particular the Shinpūren rebellion.

Origins 

In 1472, Yangming was born in a rich household in Yuyao, Zhejiang. Yangming's father ranked first place in the imperial examination in 1481, thus he had been expecting his children to inherit his knowledge and start their career by participating in the imperial examination.

When Yangming was 12 years old, Yangming's father sent him to a private school to prepare for the exam. Lou's teachings had significantly enhanced Yangming's interest in Cheng-Zhu School. After their conversations, Yangming managed to read through all of Zhu’s work, reflecting on Cheng-Zhu School’s principle that “to acquire knowledge one must study things” (格物致知). To practice this principle, Yangming spent seven days doing nothing except staring at, or so to say, studying the bamboos planted in the garden.

Not surprisingly, not only did he not learn anything from the bamboos, but Yangming also fell seriously ill after sitting in the garden for seven days. Therefore, Yangming had given up on most of the Cheng-Zhu literature, as well as the idea of taking the imperial examination. Instead, he began to read texts written by other Chinese philosophers, and eventually narrowed his focus on Taoism and Lu Jiuyuan, whose work had been a major opponent to the Cheng-Zhu's Rationalistic School.

Though Yangming had lost his faith in the imperial examination, he still signed up for the exam for the sake of his father. He passed the exam and was later assigned to work in the construction department in the central government. In 1506, Yangming was caught in political conflicts, and soon was demoted to Guizhou, the most deserted place in China at that time. Yangming soon recovered from the setback. While working on improving the living situations of people in Guizhou, Yangming developed his own philosophical principles, which were then called Yangminism, based on The Great Learning and Lu's work.

Yangmingism became hugely popular in Southern China, especially Jiangxi and Jiangnan (except Suzhou), but not Anhui and Fujian, and by the sixteenth century the Cheng-Zhu orthodox school even in the North could not ignore its basic philosophical claims. The Yangmingist belief that all men were equally capable of moral behaviour led them to advocate the formation of jiangxue study communities and that participating in the state was not necessary, which in turn led to rise of the Donglin movement. Northern literati, more dependent on governmental routes to success than their Southern counterparts, were less receptive to Yangmingism.

Major philosophy principles

"The Supreme Principle is Buried in One's Heart-Mind" 
Yangming inherits Lu Jiuyuan's idea that everything one needs can be found in one's heart, opposing to Cheng-Zhu's idea that one must learn from the external things. This was promoted with the adage "The Supreme Principle is Buried in One's Mind" (不离日用常行内，直到先天未画时).

Yangming argues that there are countless matters existing in the world, we can never get to study all of, or even most of them. However, when we are interacting with the world, we are using our consciousness to look, smell, and hear what is all around us. Thus, we can find the existence of the whole world in our minds. If we think deeper, we can even see the extensions of the world there. The recognition of extensions here doesn't mean that one can see the whole picture of Eiffel Tower even he has never been to Paris. What Yangming has been trying to prove is that, as we have a completed set of perceptions of the world in our minds, we have as well gotten a hold of the ultimate philosophy, the truth of the world, the supreme principles which have been guiding and teaching us through the ages.

Achieve the ultimate consciousness 

In his book, or Instructions for Practical Living and Other Neo-Confucian Writings in English, Yangming writes that "there is nothing exists outside our minds, there is no supreme principle exists outside our hearts." However, the problem here is that we let all kinds of selfish desires cover up the supreme principle, so we can't  practice the principle well in our daily lives. Yangming uses an example in his book to demonstrate his idea: if we see a child fall into water well, we can't help but feel bad for the child. The feeling of bad here is an embodiment of the inherent supreme principle in our minds. But, if the child happens to be the son of one's biggest enemy, he may not feel bad for the child after all. This is the situation in which the supreme principle is covered by selfish desires. If one can remove all selfish desires from one's heart, then he would achieve the ultimate consciousness, which is the final purpose pursued by many Chinese philosophers throughout centuries.

One thing worth noticing here is that, the ultimate consciousness is also in accordance with Cheng-Zhu's "to acquire knowledge one must study things" in a way. This means that one must conduct appropriate behaviors under certain circumstances. For instance, everyone knows they should care about their families' wellbeing. But if one only asks whether his families are feeling good or bad and does nothing when he receives the answer "feeling bad", this cannot count as the ultimate consciousness. Only does one actually do things to take care of his families can be considered as knowing the ultimate consciousness.

The unity of inner knowledge and action 
The unity of inner knowledge and action, or "", is probably the most important and well-known concept in Yangmingism. Yangming explains this concept as "Nobody can separate the knowledge and the action apart. If one knows, one will act. If one knows but don't act, then he has never actually known it. If you can obtain both, when you know something, you are already doing it; when you are doing something, then you already know it."

"Nowadays, many people treat knowledge and actions as two distinct things. They think the need to know first, only then can they do something in this area. This lead them to do nothing, as well as to know nothing."

In other words,  could be interpret as the consistency of one's Supreme Principle and his objective actions. In the example of a child falling into water well, the action is not trying to save the child, but "feeling bad for the child". And the knowledge, the part of the Supreme Principle used here is the sympathy for others. For those who doesn't feel bad for the child, they haven't learn the knowledge of sympathy yet, thus they cannot apply the knowledge in their actions.

Similar ideas can be found in the western literature. In Demian, Hermann Hesse writes that "only the thoughts that we live out have any value." MIT's motto "Mens et Manus," or "Mind and Hand," also reflect the importance of combining the inner knowledge and actions as one.

The Four-Sentence Teaching 
In 1528, one year before his death, Yangming summaries his philosophies into a doctrine called "the Four-Sentence Teaching". The original Chinese text is "". which can be translated as "The Substance of the mind lacks good and lacks evil. When intentions are formed there is good and there is evil. 'Pure knowing' is knowing good and knowing evil. 'Getting a handle on things' is to do good and eliminate evil."

Education philosophies 
Yangming regards education as the most efficient way to inspire people to find the Supreme Principle in their minds; it means that not only do education institutions need to teach students academic knowledge, but they also need to teach students moral and ethical principles. He again emphasized the necessity of uniting knowledge and actions as one in the process of education. Yangming believed that in order to achieve something, one must set up a specific goal first.

Genres

Left philosophical genre

Zhezhong School 
Notable figures in this genre include Nie Bao, Zou Shouyi, Xu Jie, and Zhang Juzheng. Zhezhong School emphasizes on inner virtues. Scholars in this school regard virtues and knowledge are the foundation of one's life, arguing that one should solely focus on learning instead of actively seeking fames or reputations. They emphasize the importance of education.

Right philosophical genre

Taizhou School 
Notable figures include He Xinyin, Yan Shannong, and Wang Gen. Taizhou School became widespread because it focuses on the general public. Scholars in Taizhou School believe that even the most ordinary person has the possibility of accomplishing extraordinary achievements. Everyone is a potential saint, as the  universal truth is buried their own mind. Taizhou School is rebellious against both the traditional and the Neo-Confucianism.

Critics 
Chinese historian and philosopher, Wang Fuzhi, criticized that Yangming is more of a Buddhism follower than a Neo-Confucianism philosopher. Yangming's excessive concentration on minds had made his teaching contain a negative attitude coming from his early education in Buddhism. Wang didn't agree with Yangming that there is no good or bad exist in both the world and people's minds. He also argued that 知行合一, the unity of inner knowledge and actions had made people can no longer separate theories and actual matter apart.

In Japan 
Yangmingism was spread to Japan in the later periods of the Ming Dynasty by a traveling Japanese monk. From 1568 to 1603, Yangmingism was at its preliminary stage in Japan. Later, when the Ming Dynasty ended, some of the Ming scholars fled to Japan and helped to develop Yangmingism there. In 1789, Yangmingism became an influential philosophy among the 
Japanese. Yangmingism had also played an essential role to Japan's Meiji Restoration.

See also 
Kokutai
Ukehi

References

Neo-Confucianism
Meiji_Restoration
Confucianism_in_Japan